Central Reference Library is an Indian National Bibliographic Agency in Kolkata which run under Ministry of Culture of India. It provides bibliographic services to scholars, universities, institutions and government agencies. This library has started doing digitalization of rare and old books and documents. It receives three published book from any publisher of India as per provision of Delivery of Books and Newspapers Act 1956.

History 
It was established in 1955 in the campus of National Library of India as National Bibliographic and Documentation Centre.

References 

Government agencies of India
National libraries
Ministry of Culture (India)
Libraries established in 1955